Rubén Alvarenga (born 29 August 1972) is a Paraguayan former professional tennis player.

Alvarenga was a junior Banana Bowl winner and made the fourth round of the boys' singles at the 1989 French Open.

From 1989 to 1995, Alvarenga appeared in nine Davis Cup ties for Paraguay. He played in a combined 19 singles and doubles rubbers for only one win. This came in one of his 13 singles matches, against Rafael Moreno of the Dominican Republic in 1993, which helped secure a 3–2 win in the tie.

In 1995 he featured in the qualifying draw for the Wimbledon Championships.

References

External links
 
 
 

1972 births
Living people
Paraguayan male tennis players
20th-century Paraguayan people